is a Japanese singer and actress. She is affiliated with Big Apple Co., Ltd. Nakayama is nicknamed , and sometimes uses the pseudonyms  or  when she writes the lyrics.

Biography

History
Nakayama was born in Saku, Nagano, Japan. Following her mother's remarriage, her family moved to Koganei, Tokyo. There, Nakayama attended Koganei Municipal Junior High School.

Idol career
After being discovered by a talent scout while shopping in Harajuku, she made her debut on 21 June 1985 with her single "C", as well as a starring role in the film Be-Bop High School. Throughout her career as a singer and actress, Nakayama recorded 22 studio albums and scored eight No. 1 singles on Oricon's charts; two of them selling over a million copies each. She also starred in a Famicom Disk System dating sim made by Nintendo titled Nakayama Miho no Tokimeki High School, in which she played a high school student trying to mask her true identity.

Acting career
In 1995, director Shunji Iwai cast Nakayama in the starring dual roles of Hiroko Watanabe and Itsuki Fujii in the film Love Letter. The film was a huge box-office success, and Nakayama won Best Actress awards for her role in the film at the 38th Blue Ribbon Awards, the 17th Yokohama Film Festival and the 18th Hochi Film Awards.

Nakayama was nominated for a Best Actress Japanese Academy Award in 1998 for her role in Tokyo Biyori, and has appeared in a number of TV series including Love Story (2001).

On 8 November 2021, Nakayama starred alongside King & Prince member Yuta Jinguji in the stage play  at The Globe Tokyo. The play ran until December 5.

Personal life
Nakayama's younger sister is Shinobu Nakayama, who is also an actress and former pop singer. She also has a younger brother named Tomoaki.

Nakayama had been signed to the same Box Corporation and before debut, became friends with Yasuko Endō. Two years after Endō's suicide, Nakayama performed song called "Long Distance Tengoku e" during concert tour 1988. As an homage to the title of Endō's cancelled debut single "In the Distance", it was held as a requiem for her. Nakayama wrote the lyrics and composed the song herself. The song title changed to "Long Distance To The Heaven", and it was included on the album Mind Game, released July that year. She touched about this song in the 1991 essay collection P.S. I Love You. Also in the 2009 collection Nazenara Yasashii Machi ga Atta Kara, Endō is written about with name excluded.

Nakayama married musician Hitonari Tsuji in 2002 after an eight-month relationship and they both moved to Paris before she gave birth to their son a year later. They divorced in 2014, and Nakayama moved back to Japan, with Tsuji retaining custody of their son.

Discography 

Studio albums
 C (1985)
 After School (1985)
 Summer Breeze (1986)
 Exotique (1986)
 One and Only (1987)
 Catch the Nite (1988)
 Mind Game (1988)
 Angel Hearts (1988)
 Hide 'n' Seek (1989)
 Merry Merry (1989)
 All for You (1990)
 Jeweluna (1990)
 Dé eaya (1991)
 Mellow (1992)
 Wagamama na Actress (1993)
 Pure White (1994)
 Mid Blue (1995)
 Deep Lip French (1996)
 Groovin' Blue' (1997)
 Olive (1998)
 Manifesto (1999)
 Neuf Neuf (2019)

Filmography

FilmBe-Bop High School (1985) – Kyōko IzumiWho Do I Choose? (1989) – Nobuko KuwataNami no kamidake dakishimete (1991)Love Letter (1995) – Hiroko Watanabe and Itsuki FujiiMarmalade Boy (2018)Butterfly Sleep (2018)Aiuta: My Promise to Nakuhito (2019)108: Revenge and Adventure of Goro Kaiba (2019) – Ayako KaibaLast Letter (2020) – SakaeLesson in Murder (2022) – Eriko Kakei

TelevisionMaido Osawagase Shimasu (1985) – Nodoka MoriUchi no Ko ni Kagitte... (1985) – Nobuko TakaokaNatsu Taiken Monogatari (1985) – Yuki SugimotoNa-ma-i-ki Mori (1986) - Kayoko KinoshitaMama wa Idol (1987–88) – herselfSuteki na Kataomoi (1990) – Keiko Yoda/Nana HayashiAitai Toki ni Anata wa Inai (1991) – Miyoko OkiNobunaga: King of Zipangu (1992) – NeneNemureru Mori (1998) – Minako ŌbaW's Tragedy (2019) – Yoshie

Kōhaku Uta Gassen appearances

Bibliography
 Issho Kenmei Nakayama Miho Photo Collection (1985, Wani Books) - Photo Collection
 Toumei de Iru Yo, Meippai Onna no Ko (1985, Wani Books) - Essay Collection
 Miho Ganbaru (1986, Shueisha) - Photo Collection
 Docchi ni Suru no. (1989, Shueisha) - Photo Collection
 Ambivalence Nakayama Miho Shashinshu (1989, Wani Books) - Photo Collection
 SCENA miho nakayama pictorial (1991, Wani Books)  - Photo Collection
 P.S. I LOVE YOU (1991, Nippon Hassou Shuppan and Fusosha Publishing) - Essay Collection
 LETTERS in Love Letter（Nakayama Miho Photo Collection） (1995, Wani Books) - Photo Collection
 Nakayama Miho in Eiga Tokyo Biyori (1997, Wani Books) - Photo Collection
 Atashi to Watashi  (1997, Gentosha) - Novel
 ANGEL (1998, Wani Books) - Photo Collection
 Nazenara Yasashii Machi ga Atta Kara'' (2009, Shueisha) - Photo Essay Collection

References

External links 
  
 
 
 
 
 Miho Nakayama at Oricon
 Miho Nakayama at Idol.ne.jp

1970 births
Living people
People from Nagano Prefecture
People from Koganei, Tokyo
Japanese actresses
Japanese idols
Japanese women pop singers
Japanese expatriates in France
English-language singers from Japan
King Records (Japan) artists
21st-century Japanese singers
21st-century Japanese women singers